The Schlüchtsee is a small, artificial lake in the Southern Black Forest near Grafenhausen in the county of Waldshut in Germany, through which the River Schlücht flows.

History and size 

In 1791, St. Blaise Abbey needed an ice pond for the nearby brewery in Rothaus and so the Schlücht was impounded. A textile dyers' was soon added which ran until the 1920s. The meadows were used for bleaching and the lake water for dyeing. Bathing was not introduced until the 20th century and was during this time that the little wooden bathing hut was built. With the development of the lake around 1920 by Swiss nobleman, Ernest of Adelsheim, the value of conservation, especially water lilies, was established. This was continued by the former tenant of the Schlüchtsee farm, Erich Gold. Today the water lilies are separated from the bathing area by logs, and the bathing beach also has a kiosk.

The lake is popular for bathing and angling. A path runs past the lake to the Hüsli, named after Klausjürgen Wussow. The lake is part of a nature reserve, no. 3,032 covering 8.5 ha and known as the "Schlüchtsee", that was established on 11 October 1940.

References

Literature
 Christian Neumann, Die Seen des Schwarzwaldes, 1978,  
 Rudolf Metz, Geologische Landeskunde des Hotzenwaldes, 1987 
  Regierungspräsidium Freiburg (publ.): Die Naturschutzgebiete im Regierungsbezirk Freiburg. Thorbecke, Stuttgart, 2011,

External links 

 

Nature reserves in Baden-Württemberg
LSchluchtsee 
Lakes of the Black Forest
Waldshut (district)
Baden
IUCN Category IV